The Indonesian Democratic Party (PDI) was one of the two state-approved parties during the New Order era of the late 20th-century in Indonesia.

Origins
Ten political parties participated in the 1971 legislative elections, a number that President Suharto considered to be too much. Suharto wished that political parties be reduced to just two or three and that the parties should be grouped based on their programs.

The basis for the merger that would result in the birth of PDI was a coalition of the five Nationalist and non-Islamic Parties in the People's Representative Council (DPR) called the Democracy Development Faction. This faction consisted of the Indonesian National Party (PNI, Sukarno's former party), the League of Supporters of Indonesian Independence (IPKI), Murba Party (Partai Murba), the Indonesian Christian Party (Parkindo), Catholic Party (Partai Katolik).

On 10 January 1973, as part of Suharto's program to reduce political parties, these five parties were merged to form PDI.

Factions
The PNI, the largest of the PDI's five parties, and the legatee of Sukarno, had its base in East and Central Java. IPKI had been strongly anti-PKI in the Old Order in contrast to the once-leftist Partai Murba. Even more heterogeneous than the United Development Party (PPP), the PDI, with no common ideological link other than the commitment to the Pancasila as its sole principle, was faction-ridden and riven with personality disputes.

This factionalism was displayed in the 1977 Legislative Elections, the first Legislative Elections that PDI participated in. The Party was unable to show a united front and would come 
third and last in the 1977 Legislative Elections.

Government intervention
The 1977 Legislative Elections would also see a tense political battle between Golkar and PPP. The Government became worried that with PDI struggling to function as a party, Indonesian society would be polarized into a secular camp (Golkar) and an Islamic camp (PPP). To counter this, the Government decided to actively intervene into PDI's affairs and make it into a 3rd Party to prevent the polarization that it feared.

Measures were taken by the Government to keep PDI going as a Party which at one time involved the Minister of Home Affairs to arrange PDI's Congresses for them. Efforts were also made to encourage PDI, such as refurbishing the tomb of the late President Sukarno in 1978 and officially recognizing him as the "Hero of Independence Proclamation". This recognition of Sukarno was a change from the earlier New Order policy of playing down his achievements or ignoring him altogether.

PDI in New Order
Until Suharto's fall in 1998, PDI was the smallest political party in Indonesia. Despite playing up its Sukarnoist heritage when campaigning, PDI continued to come last in the legislative elections.

Schism with Megawati Sukarnoputri

At the 1993 National Congress, Megawati Sukarnoputri was elected as the Chairperson of PDI to replace Suryadi. The Government refused to recognize this and continued to push for Budi Harjono, their candidate for the Chairpersonship to be elected. A Special Congress was held where the Government expected to have Harjono elected, but Megawati once again emerged victorious. The victory was consolidated when a PDI National Assembly ratified the results of the Congress.

In June 1996, the Government finally made its move. Another National Congress was held in Medan, where Megawati was not invited to come along and attended by anti-Megawati members. With the Government's backing, Suryadi was re-elected as PDI's Chairperson. Megawati refused to acknowledge the results of this congress and continued to see herself as the rightful leader of PDI.

Suryadi began threatening to take back PDI's Headquarters in Jakarta. This threat came true during the morning of 27 July 1996. That morning, Suryadi's supporters (reportedly with the Government's backing) attacked the PDI Headquarters and faced resistance from Megawati supporters who had been stationed there ever since the National Congress in Medan. In the ensuing fight, Megawati's supporters managed to hold on to the headquarters.

A riot then ensued, followed by a crackdown by the Government. The Government would later blame the riots on the People's Democratic Party.

PDI was now divided into two factions, Megawati's faction and Suryadi's faction. In the 1997 Legislative Elections, Mega and her faction threw their votes behind PPP while PDI languished with only 3% of the votes.

In October 1998, after Suharto's fall, Megawati declared the formation of Indonesian Democratic Party-Struggle (PDI-P) to differentiate her faction of PDI from the Government backed one.

1999 legislative elections and aftermath
PDI participated in the 1999 legislative elections and won two seats, but refused to ratify the election results. This was not enough to pass the electoral threshold to allow the party to participate in the following elections in 2004. After failing to join with other parties to reach the threshold, the party renamed itself the Indonesian Democratic Vanguard Party.

Chairpersons
Mohammad Isnaeni (1973–76)
Sanusi Hardjadinata (1976–81)
Sunawar Sukowati (1981–86)
Suryadi (1986–93, 1996–98)
Megawati Sukarnoputri (1993–96)
Budi Harjono (1998–2003)

Legislative election results

References
1999 Legislative Elections Profile 
Akan Tergusurkah Megawati Soekarnoputri? 
Megawati Profile on tokohindonesia.com

Notes

 
1973 establishments in Indonesia
2003 disestablishments in Indonesia
Defunct political parties in Indonesia
Defunct socialist parties in Asia
Political parties disestablished in 2003
Political parties established in 1973
Socialist parties in Indonesia